The band-bellied owl (Pulsatrix melanota) is a species of owl in the family Strigidae. It is found in Bolivia, Colombia, Ecuador and Peru.

Taxonomy and systematics

The band-bellied owl may form a superspecies with tawny-browed owl (Pulsatrix koeniswaldiana). It has been suggested that they are conspecific but they have different morphology and vocalizations. The band-bellied owl has two subspecies, the nominate P. m. melanota and P. m. philoscia.

Description

The adult has a dark brown facial disk and white "brows" over dark reddish brown eyes. Its upperparts are dark chocolate brown with scattered buffy-white spots. The tail is also dark brown, with thin white bars. The upper breast is reddish brown with buff barring. The rest of the underparts are white to creamy with reddish brown barring. The juvenile's plumage has not been described.

Distribution and habitat

The nominate subspecies of band-bellied owl is found on the eastern slope of the Andes from central Colombia south through Ecuador and Peru. P. m. philoscia is found from there to west-central Bolivia. It primarily inhabits the interior of humid montane forest and foothills rainforest but is also found on forest edges and in clearings with scattered trees.

Behavior

Feeding

The band-bellied owl is nocturnal. Its diet is poorly studied but is known to include large insects.

Breeding

Though there is no published information on the band-bellied owl's breeding phenology, it is presumed to nest in natural tree cavities.

Vocalization

The band-bellied owl's vocalizations are also poorly known. It is "[s]aid to give a short, deep trill followed by fast burst of popping notes", and "deep, muffled hoots" have been recorded in Peru. The sexes perform duets.

Status

The IUCN has assessed the band-bellied owl as being of Least Concern. However, the species is poorly known and "could be threatened by habitat loss".

References

band-bellied owl
Birds of the Yungas
band-bellied owl
Taxonomy articles created by Polbot